General elections were held in Belgium on 2 April 1939. The result was a victory for the Catholic Party, which won 67 of the 202 seats in the Chamber of Representatives. Voter turnout was 93.3%.

On 22 February 1939, the Pierlot Government succeeded the Spaak Government. The Government was in a political crisis caused by, among other things, the Martens Affair. As the Pierlot Government fell as well and the ministers failed to form a stable government, King Leopold III insisted on a dissolution of parliament, but the council of ministers refused due to fear for electoral losses. It was not Prime Minister Pierlot, but the Minister of the Interior who provided the required  of the royal order of 6 March 1939 which dissolved the Chambers and triggered the snap elections.

After the election, Pierlot continued as Prime Minister. The elections were the last ones before the Second World War.

Results

Chamber of Representatives

Senate

References

Belgium
1930s elections in Belgium
General
Belgium